Michael Olver Hammond (10 July 1945 – 6 June 2018) was an Australian rules footballer who played with Richmond in the Victorian Football League (VFL).

Originally from Maryborough, Victoria, Hammond played for Maryborough Football Club in the Ballarat Football League and Eaglehawk and Golden Square Football Clubs in the Bendigo Football League.

Notes

External links 

Tigerland Archive profile

1945 births
Australian rules footballers from Victoria (Australia)
Richmond Football Club players
Maryborough Football Club players
2018 deaths